Alydus is the type genus of broad-headed bugs in the family Alydidae. There are about 11 described species in Alydus, including 2 extinct species.  Species are recorded from North America and Europe through to temperate Asia.

Species
These 11 species belong to the genus Alydus:

 Alydus angulatus Hsiao, 1965
 Alydus calcaratus (Linnaeus, 1758) - red-backed bug - type species (as Cimex calcaratus Linnaeus)
 Alydus conspersus Montandon, 1893
 Alydus eurinus (Say, 1825)
 Alydus pilosulus Herrich-Schaeffer, 1847
 Alydus rupestris Fieber, 1861
 Alydus scutellatus Van Duzee, 1903
 Alydus tomentosus Fracker, 1918
 Alydus zichyi Horváth, 1901
 † Alydus pristinus Germar, 1837
 † Alydus pulchellus Heer, 1853

References

Further reading

External links

 

Alydinae
Pentatomomorpha genera